Highland Cotton Mills Village Historic District is a historic mill village and national historic district located at High Point, Guilford County, North Carolina. The district encompasses 177 contributing buildings (165 are mill houses) and 1 contributing structure.  They include the two mills and the shipping and packing building at the Highland Cotton Mills, the Highland Cotton Mills Office, the Highland Methodist Church and its parsonage, the Johnson Farm House.

It was listed on the National Register of Historic Places in 2014.

References

External links

Buildings and structures in High Point, North Carolina
Historic districts on the National Register of Historic Places in North Carolina
National Register of Historic Places in Guilford County, North Carolina